The 1960 NBA World Championship Series was the championship series of the 1960 NBA Playoffs, which concluded the National Basketball Association 1959–60 season. The best-of-seven series was played between the Western Conference champion St. Louis Hawks and the Eastern Conference champion  Boston Celtics. It was Boston's fourth trip to the NBA Finals and St. Louis' third. The Celtics beat the Hawks 4–3. The Finals featured Hall of Famers Bill Russell, Bob Cousy, Tom Heinsohn, Bill Sharman, Frank Ramsey, Sam Jones, K.C. Jones, Coach Red Auerbach, Bob Pettit, Cliff Hagan, Slater Martin, Clyde Lovellette, and Coach Alex Hannum.

This was the last time the NBA Finals would be played in March.

Series summary

Celtics win series 4–3

Team rosters

Boston Celtics

St. Louis Hawks

External links
 1960 Finals at NBA.com
 1960 NBA Playoffs at Basketball-Reference.com

Finals
National Basketball Association Finals
NBA
NBA
NBA Finals
NBA Finals
Basketball competitions in Boston
Basketball competitions in St. Louis
1960s in Boston
1960s in St. Louis
NBA Finals
NBA Finals